John Carroll Lynch (born August 1, 1963) is an American character actor and film director. He first gained notice for his role as Norm Gunderson in Fargo (1996). He is also known for his television work on the ABC sitcom The Drew Carey Show (1997–2004) as the title character's cross-dressing brother, Steve Carey, as well as on four seasons of American Horror Story (2014–2019), most notably as breakout character Twisty the Clown. His films include Face/Off (1997), Zodiac (2007), Gran Torino (2008), Shutter Island (2010), Crazy, Stupid, Love (2011), Ted 2 (2015), The Invitation (2015), The Founder (2016), and The Trial of the Chicago 7 (2020). He made his directorial debut with the 2017 film Lucky.

Early life
Lynch was born in Boulder, Colorado. He attended Regis Jesuit High School in Denver. He studied theater at The Catholic University of America, graduating with a Bachelor of Fine Arts degree in 1986.

Career
Lynch was a member of the Guthrie Theater company. He starred in several productions, toured with the company and worked there for over eight seasons. 

Lynch made his feature film debut in Grumpy Old Men (1993). He gained notice in a supporting role as Norm Gunderson in the Coen brothers' film Fargo (1996). His other notable films are Face/Off (1997), Bubble Boy (2001), Gothika (2003), Things We Lost in the Fire (2007), Gran Torino (2008), Shutter Island (2010), Paul (2011) and Crazy, Stupid, Love (2011). He portrayed Arthur Leigh Allen in Zodiac (2007) and the first establisher of McDonald's, Mac McDonald, in The Founder (2016).

Lynch has also had an extensive career in television. He appeared in ABC sitcom The Drew Carey Show as the title character's cross-dressing brother, Steve Carey. He has also been a regular cast member on series such as Close to Home, Carnivàle, Body of Proof and seasons 4, 5, 7 and 9 of American Horror Story.

In 2018, Lynch was cast in the lead role of Bud Carl in the CBS All Access drama One Dollar. The series was cancelled after one season. In 2020, Lynch plays the lead role of Rick Legarski in the ABC crime drama series Big Sky, created by David E. Kelley. After his character was killed off, he resurfaced as Wolf Legarski, Rick's twin brother.  He also co-starred in Aaron Sorkin's acclaimed film The Trial of the Chicago 7, as activist David Dellinger.

Personal life
Lynch has been married to actress Brenda Wehle (also a former member of the Guthrie Theatre Company) since 1997.

Filmography

Film

Television

Awards and nominations

References

External links

1963 births
American male film actors
American male television actors
Catholic University of America alumni
Living people
Male actors from Boulder, Colorado
Male actors from Denver
Outstanding Performance by a Cast in a Motion Picture Screen Actors Guild Award winners
20th-century American male actors
21st-century American male actors